Frank Albert Cope (8 December 1928 – 5 November 2012) was an English male weightlifter.

Weightlifting career
He represented England in the −56 kg Combined division and won a silver medal at the 1954 British Empire and Commonwealth Games in Vancouver, Canada.

References

1928 births
2012 deaths
English male weightlifters
Commonwealth Games medallists in weightlifting
Commonwealth Games silver medallists for England
Weightlifters at the 1954 British Empire and Commonwealth Games
20th-century English people
21st-century English people
Medallists at the 1954 British Empire and Commonwealth Games